The 2018 WAFU/FOX U-20 Tournament was the first edition of the international U-20 men's football event for teams under the West African Football Union. The competition will be hosted by Liberia in April to May 2018 in two match venues. The organizers of the tournament, which is sponsored by FOX Sports, said it will run from April 24, to May 6, 2018 in Monrovia and will feature eight of the nine countries in WAFU Zone A who have confirmed their participation in the zonal youth championship.

Host Liberia, Cape Verde, Guinea Bissau and Sierra Leone make up Group A whilst Senegal, Mali, Gambia and Guinea complete Group B.

Matches will be held at the Samuel Kanyon Doe Sports Stadium and the Antoinette Tubman Stadium, both in Monrovia, Liberia.

Participants

Group A

Group B

Officials

Referees
 Daouda Gueye
 Omar Sallah
 Babacar Sarr
 Harouna Coulibaly
 Gilberto Antonio dos Santos  
 Jerry Yekeh 
 Baba Leno
 Raymond Coker

Assistant Referees
 Serigne Cheikh Touré
 Ebrima Jallow
 Hamedine Diba 
 Baba Yomboliba
 Firmino Bassafim
 Sekou Kanneh Jr
 Ibrahim Ba
 Mamadou Tere

Draw

The draw was held on 26 March in Monrovia.

Player eligibility
Players born 1 January 1998 or later are eligible to participate in the competition.

Group stage
The top two teams of each group advance to the semi-finals.

Tiebreakers
Teams are ranked according to points (3 points for a win, 1 point for a draw, 0 points for a loss), and if tied on points, the following tie-breaking criteria are applied, in the order given, to determine the rankings.
Points in head-to-head matches among tied teams;
Goal difference in all group matches;
Goals scored in all group matches;
Disciplinary points (yellow card = 1 point, red card as a result of two yellow cards = 3 points, direct red card = 3 points, yellow card followed by direct red card = 4 points);
Drawing of lots.
If, after applying criteria 1 to 3 to several teams, more than two teams still have an equal ranking, criteria 1 to 3 are reapplied exclusively to the matches between the two teams in question to determine their final rankings. If this procedure does not lead to a decision, criteria 7 to 9 apply;
Points in head-to-head matches among tied teams;
Goal difference in matches between the teams concerned;
The greatest number of goals scored in the matches between the teams concerned.

All times are local UTC±00:00.

Group A

Group B

Knockout stage

Bracket

Semi-finals

Third place match

Final

Winners

Awards

References

International association football competitions hosted by Liberia
Foo